DJ Ram is a pseudonym of Roman Olegovich Pen'kov, born on November 17, 1976, in Kirovohrad. In 1994 he finished secondary school N10 in the physico-mathematical class in Kursk and entered university in the same year, specializing in "physics and information theory".  He finished university in 2000.

DJ Ram is a well known Russian based producer and remixer , who has worked with many styles of dance music.  He began his professional career in 1997 and has been recognized as one of the best remixers in Russia .  In 1999 his collaboration track with the band Mumiy Troll was recognized as the best Russian song of year by the radio station "Maximum".  In 2002 he was named MP3 "Person of Year 2002" by the Russian search company Rambler. 
  
Although he has done very little solo work, DJ Ram is quite well known for his remixes for and collaborations with notable bands such as t.A.T.u., Ayria, Colony 5, De/Vision, Delerium, Beborn Beton, RL Grime, Red Flag, Boytronic, Sara Noxx, and Clan of Xymox.

External links
DJ Ram's web site
Information on DJ Ram (Russian)
Article on him by Peoples.ru (Russian)

1976 births
Living people
Russian musicians